Buzet is a town in Istria, west Croatia, population 6,133 (2011).

Demographics
In 2011 the total municipal population was 6,133 people, distributed in the following settlements (with population shown in parentheses):

Baredine (43), 
Bartolići (43), 
Barušići (95), 
Benčići (uninhabited),
Blatna Vas (7), 
Brnobići (52), 
Buzet (1,679),
Cunj (19), 
Čiritež (76), 
Črnica (45), 
Duričići (2), 
Erkovčići (43), 
Forčići (22), 
Gornja Nugla (76), 
Hum (30), 
Juradi (75), 
Juričići (88), 
Kajini (17), 
Klarići (39), 
Kompanj (36), 
Kosoriga (19), 
Kotli (1), 
Kras (12), 
Krbavčići (58), 
Krkuž (19), 
Krti (80), 
Krušvari (72), 
Mala Huba (68), 
Mali Mlun (64), 
Marčenegla (100), 
Marinci (49), 
Martinci (20), 
Medveje (31), 
Negnar (21), 
Paladini (47), 
Pengari (22), 
Peničići (46), 
Perci (52), 
Počekaji (41), 
Podkuk (1), 
Podrebar (12), 
Pračana (98), 
Prodani (71), 
Račice (16), 
Račički Brijeg (51), 
Rim (36), 
Rimnjak (19), 
Roč (153), 
Ročko Polje (173), 
Salež (7), 
Selca (60), 
Seljaci (19), 
Senj (24), 
Sirotići (13), 
Sovinjak (27), 
Sovinjska Brda (23), 
Sovinjsko Polje (22), 
Stanica Roč (63), 
Strana (56), 
Sušići (6), 
Sveti Donat (83), 
Sveti Ivan (227), 
Sveti Martin (1,011),
Šćulci (39), 
Škuljari (47), 
Štrped (189), 
Ugrini (48), 
Veli Mlun (63), 
Vrh (124)

History
Already at the time of Venetian rule, Buzet supplied military stations and the local population with potable water.

Geography

A few kilometers to the west is the ancient castle of Pietrapelosa.

Gallery

References

External links 

 www.buzet.hr
 Pictures of Buzet

Cities and towns in Croatia
Populated places in Istria County